Bentley Dean is an Australian documentarian, director, producer, cinematographer, and filmmaker.

Career 
Dean appeared in Race Around the World in 1997.

He is known for his collaborations with director Martin Butler.

Dean has earned critical acclaim for his works Contact (2010), First Footprints (2013), Tanna (2015), and A Sense of Self (2016) for Four Corners profiling Liz Jackson's experience of Parkinson's disease. For Tanna, he received a nomination for Best Foreign Language Film at the 89th Academy Awards.

Filmography
 2016: A Sense of Self (TV Movie documentary)    
 2015: Tanna   
 2015: Call Me Dad (TV Movie documentary)   
 2013: First Footprints (TV Series documentary)    
 2010: Contact (Documentary)    
 2008: A Well-Founded Fear (Documentary)    
 2007: The Siege (Documentary)    
 2004: The President Versus David Hicks

Accolades
Tanna has received critical acclaim. It has a score of 74% on Metacritic.

References

External links

Australian film producers
Australian film directors
Australian screenwriters
Living people
Year of birth missing (living people)